Ocean Hai (born 10 July 1982) is a Chinese musical artist.

Biography
He came in first place in the singing contest "New Idol" in 2000, then was champion of the National Hip-Hop contest in 2002. In 2005, he was invited by Jacky Cheung as a special guest to the music drama "Xue Lang Hu", in which, he himself played seven roles. Finally in 2006, he signed a contract with EEG after he came second in the CCTV program "Meng Xiang Zhong Guo" . On May 19, 2007, he released his first album "Dance Dance Dance", of which the main song is called "Lao Ren Yu Hai". His Chinese name is similar to Hemingway. Ocean Hai is managed by the Emperor Entertainment Group.

References

1982 births
Living people
Cantopop singers
Chinese Mandopop singers
Musicians from Guangzhou
Singers from Guangdong
21st-century Chinese male singers